Soma Yamauchi (山内 壮馬, born July 1, 1985 in Toyota, Aichi) is a Japanese former professional baseball pitcher in Japan's Nippon Professional Baseball. He played for the Chunichi Dragons from  2008 to 2014 and for the Tohoku Rakuten Golden Eagles in 2016.

External links

1985 births
Living people
People from Toyota, Aichi
Baseball people from Aichi Prefecture
Japanese baseball players
Nippon Professional Baseball pitchers
Chunichi Dragons players
Tohoku Rakuten Golden Eagles players